The Mabla Mountains (variants: Monti Mabla, Monts Mabla) are a mountain range in the northern Obock and Tadjoura Region of Djibouti. The endemic Djibouti spurfowl makes its home here as well as in the Forêt du Day. With a mean height of 1370 metres, is the fifth highest point in Djibouti.

Geography
Along with Forêt du Day, the Mabla Mountains are one of Djibouti's two remnant areas of closed forest. They lie on the northern side of the Gulf of Tadjoura, and are characterized as a highland region.

The mountains consist of a range that extends north from near Ras Duan, a steep cliff. It has three round summits which are formed of reddish stones.

Culture
An Afar people subgroup, Ma`andiyta (or "White"; or Mandita) stayed in the Mabla Mountains, while the Ma`andiyta of Immino (or Awsa, or Aussa, or Assaw ; or "Red") did not. The Mandita are located west of the Mabla Mountains. Another Afar subgroup, the Debne, were settled in the Mabla also. Yet another tribe is the Basooma. 

The dabou, a permanent stone dwelling, is found in certain high ground regions, such as the Mabla and Goda Mountains, as well as in Ethiopia with the Afar.

Flora and fauna
The endemic, critically endangered Djibouti spurfowl was first recorded here in 1985, with the nearby Forêt du Day being its only other location.

In the 1920s, the mountains were thickly covered with trees. The terrain includes box (Frais spp.) and acacias, as well as palm groves within ravines. Near the summit can be found ferns.

Conservation 
In recent years, the forest has been damaged severely, chiefly through forest fires, the grazing of cattle, the felling of its trees, as well as military requirements.  In the 1980s, a proposal was made to establish a national park in the mountains' Goula Region.

Climate
Mabla Mountains enjoys a mild climate throughout the winter and moderately sunny summer.

References

Mountains of Djibouti
Obock Region